Aplocera is a genus of moths of the family Geometridae.

Species
 Aplocera aequilineata (Walker, 1863)
 Aplocera annexata (Freyer, 1830)
 Aplocera bohatschi (Püngeler, 1914)
 Aplocera columbata (Metzner, 1845)
 Aplocera corsalta (Schawerda, 1928)
 Aplocera cretica (Reisser, 1974)
 Aplocera dervenaria Mentzer, 1981
 Aplocera dzungarica Vasilenko, 1995
 Aplocera efformata – lesser treble-bar (Guénée, 1858)
 Aplocera efformata britonata Leraut, 1995
 Aplocera efformata efformata (Guénée, 1858)
 Aplocera hissara Vasilenko, 1995
 Aplocera mundulata (Guenée, [1858])
 Aplocera musculata (Staudinger, 1892)
 Aplocera numidaria (Herrich-Schäffer, 1856)
 Aplocera obsitaria (Lederer, 1853)
 Aplocera opificata (Lederer, 1870)
 Aplocera perelegans (Warren, 1894)
 Aplocera plagiata – treble-bar (Linnaeus, 1758)
 Aplocera plagiata hausmanni Expòsito Hermosa, 1998
 Aplocera plagiata plagiata (Linnaeus, 1758)
 Aplocera praeformata – purple treble-bar (Hübner, 1826)
 Aplocera praeformata gibeauxi Leraut, 1995
 Aplocera praeformata praeformata (Hübner, 1826)
 Aplocera praeformata urbahni Dufay, 1981
 Aplocera roddi Vasilenko, 1995
 Aplocera simpliciata (Treitschke, 1835)
 Aplocera simpliciata balcanica (Züllich, 1936)
 Aplocera simpliciata graeciata (Staudinger, 1901)
 Aplocera simpliciata pierretaria (Guillemot, 1856)
 Aplocera simpliciata simpliciata (Treitschke, 1835)
 Aplocera uniformata (Urbahn, 1971)
 Aplocera vivesi Expòsito Hermosa, 1998

External links
 Aplocera on Fauna Europaea
 Aplocera at Markku Savela's Lepidoptera and Some Other Life Forms

 
Chesiadini
Geometridae genera